Kopaki was a flag station on the North Island Main Trunk line, in the Waitomo District of New Zealand.

It was part of the Puketutu to Poro-O-Tarao contract, which began in September 1892. From 18 January 1897 a weekly goods train ran to Poro-O-Tarao.

A cattle yard was built in 1920. The passing loop was lengthened in 1939, to hold 219 rather than 97 wagons. The work was done at the same time the loop at Waiteti was installed, the total cost for both being £19,000.

The gradient to the north of the station is 1 in 70.

There was a Farmers Union store at Kopaki in 1920 and a sawmill in 1952.

A 1980 report said there was a concrete block shelter shed and a loop for 121 wagons.

The 1925-26 timber bridge carrying SH30 over the railway is being rebuilt between 2021 and 2023 to carry high productivity vehicles.

Only the shelter shed and passing loop remain.

References

External links 

 Video of electric freight train going through passing loop
2016 photos of former Auckland passenger trains  
 1964 photo of Ka 953 in Kopaki Gorge

Defunct railway stations in New Zealand
Waitomo District
Rail transport in Waikato
Buildings and structures in Waikato
Railway stations opened in 1901
Railway stations closed in 1982
1901 establishments in New Zealand
1982 disestablishments in New Zealand